The 36th annual Berlin International Film Festival was held 14–25 February 1986. The festival opened with Ginger and Fred by Federico Fellini, which played out of competition at the festival. The Golden Bear was awarded to West German film Stammheim directed by Reinhard Hauff. The retrospective was in honour of German actress and film producer Henny Porten and the homage was dedicated to American film director Fred Zinnemann. Claude Lanzmann's 9 hour long documentary film  Shoah about The Holocaust was screened at the Young Filmmakers Forum (renamed the International Forum of New Cinema in 1987).

Jury

The following people were announced as being on the jury for the festival:
 Gina Lollobrigida, actress (Italy) - Jury President
 Rudi Fehr, editor (United Kingdom)
 Lindsay Anderson, director (United Kingdom)
 August Coppola, academic (United States)
 Werner Grassmann, producer, director and screenwriter (West Germany)
 Otar Iosseliani, director and screenwriter (Soviet Union)
 Norbert Kückelmann, director and screenwriter (West Germany)
 Françoise Maupin, journalist and film critic (France)
 Rosaura Revueltas, actress (Mexico)
 Naoki Togawa, writer and co-founder of Polska Szkoła Filmowa (Poland)
 Jerzy Toeplitz, film critic (Japan)

Films in competition
The following films were in competition for the Golden Bear:

Out of competition
 Ginger and Fred, directed by Federico Fellini (Italy, France, West Germany)
 Heilt Hitler!, directed by Herbert Achternbusch (West Germany)
 Out of Africa, directed by Sydney Pollack (USA)
 L'Unique, directed by Jérôme Diamant-Berger (France)
 The Journey of Natty Gann, directed by Jeremy Kagan (USA)
 To Live and Die in L.A., directed by William Friedkin (USA)
 Karins ansikte, directed by Ingmar Bergman (Sweden)

Key
{| class="wikitable" width="550" colspan="1"
| style="background:#FFDEAD;" align="center"| †
|Winner of the main award for best film in its section
|-
| colspan="2"| The opening and closing films are screened during the opening and closing ceremonies respectively.
|}

Retrospective
The following films were shown in the retrospective in honour of Henny Porten:

The following films were shown in the homage dedicated to Fred Zinnemann:

The film Le Brasier ardent by Ivan Mosjoukine and Alexandre Volkoff was also shown in the retrospective as a tribute to the Cinémathèque Française for its 50th anniversary.

Awards
The following prizes were awarded by the Jury:
 Golden Bear: Stammheim by Reinhard Hauff
 Silver Bear – Special Jury Prize: La messa è finita by Nanni Moretti
 Silver Bear for Best Director: Georgiy Shengelaya for Akhalgazrda kompozitoris mogzauroba
 Silver Bear for Best Actress: 
 Charlotte Valandrey for Rouge Baiser
 Marcélia Cartaxo for A Hora da Estrela
 Silver Bear for Best Actor: Tuncel Kurtiz for Hiuch HaGdi
 Silver Bear for an outstanding single achievement: Caravaggio
 Silver Bear for an outstanding artistic contribution: Yari no gonza
 Honourable Mention: Pas în doi
 FIPRESCI Award
Stammheim by Reinhard Hauff

References

External links
36th Berlin International Film Festival 1986
1986 Berlin International Film Festival
Berlin International Film Festival:1986 at Internet Movie Database

36
1986 film festivals
1986 in West Germany
1980s in West Berlin
Berlin